Morteza Lotfi is an Iranian reformist journalist politician who served as a Tehran councilman. A senior member of the Islamic Labour Party, he was formerly managing director of the newspaper Kar va Kargar.

References 

 Biography

1955 births
Living people
Islamic Labour Party politicians
Worker House members
Tehran Councillors 1999–2003